Fuente Fuente OpusX is the premier cigar line in the Arturo Fuente Cigar family. Made by Tabacalera A. Fuente, this cigar is consistently ranked as the single most sought-after cigar in the world by Cigar Aficionado and the line is held by many to be the greatest cigar in history to date. The cigars are rare and can be difficult to obtain. Prized by collectors, many OpusX's sell for 300% or more of their suggested retail price on the secondary market.  Fuente Fuente OpusX cigars are wrapped in Rosado leaves which are grown in the Chateau de la Fuente plantation in a tropic river valley in the Dominican Republic. The Opus name is derived from its unique Rosado leaf wrapper.

Fuente Fuente OpusX line

Limited editions
 Fuente Fuente OpusX-The Lost City, Piramide - 6.38 x 52
 Fuente Fuente OpusX Forbidden X Lancero –  x 36

Notes

References

External links

Fuente Fuente OpusX, Cigar Aficionadao 
Interview with Carlos Fuente Sr.,Cigar Aficionado 
Interview with Carlos Fuente Jr.,Cigar Aficionado

Cigar brands